Basidiophora is a genus of oomycetes belonging to the family Peronosporaceae. It is a water mold that causes downy mildew disease on plants such as the New England aster.

The species of this genus are found in Europe, Japan, Northern America and New Zealand.

Species:

Basidiophora delawarensis 
Basidiophora entospora 
Basidiophora montana 
Basidiophora simplex

References

Peronosporales
Water mould genera